The 1986–87 Serie A season ended with Napoli doing the "domestic double", winning their first Scudetto and third Coppa Italia, spurred on by their talismanic captain Diego Maradona, who had also just played a key part in World Cup glory for his home country of Argentina.

Events
Juventus, Internazionale, Hellas Verona and Milan (beating Sampdoria after tie-breaker re-introduction) all qualified for the 1987/1988 UEFA Cup, while Brescia, Atalanta, and Udinese in consequence of Totonero 1986, were all relegated to Serie B.

Atalanta, while being relegated to Serie B, had the unusual distinction of also qualifying for the 1987/1988 Cup Winners' Cup as 1986–87 Coppa Italia runners-up.

Final classification

Teams
Ascoli, Brescia and Empoli had been promoted from Serie B.

Results

UEFA Cup qualification

Milan qualified for 1987-88 UEFA Cup.

Top goalscorers

References and sources

Almanacco Illustrato del Calcio - La Storia 1898-2004, Panini Edizioni, Modena, September 2005

External links
 :it:Classifica calcio Serie A italiana 1987 - Italian version with pictures and info.
  - All results on RSSSF Website.
 A collection of goals

Serie A seasons
Italy
1986–87 in Italian football leagues